Psalteriomonas lanterna is a species of amoebae in the group of Heterolobosea. The cells of the flagellate stage show four nuclei, four ventral grooves and four mastigont systems, each with four flagella. It lacks a Golgi apparatus and reproduction occurs in both stages of its life cycle.

References

Further reading

External links

Percolozoa
Protists described in 1990